The 13th Infantry Division (13-ya Pekhotnaya Diviziya) was an infantry formation of the Russian Imperial Army that existed in various formations from the early 19th century until the end of World War I and the Russian Revolution. The division was based in Sevastopol in the years leading up to 1914. It fought in World War I and was demobilized in 1918.

Organization 
The 13th Infantry Division was part of the 7th Army Corps.
1st Brigade (HQ Proskurov)
45th Azov Infantry Regiment 
46th Dnieper Infantry Regiment
2nd Brigade (HQ Kamenets-Podolsk)
47th Ukrainian Infantry Regiment
48th Odessa Infantry Regiment
12th Artillery Brigade

Commanders
1812-1813: Dmitry Neverovsky
1879-1884: Andrey Korf
May-October 1886: Alexander Konstantinovich Abramov
1886-1888: Mikhail Batyanov
1892–1895: Dmitrij Petrovich Dohturov
1895–1896: Vladimir Nikolayevich Filipov
1902-1903: Konstantin Tserpitsky
1903-1904: Andrey Selivanov

Commanders of the 1st Brigade
1889: Vladimir Nikolayevich Filipov

References 

Infantry divisions of the Russian Empire
Military units and formations disestablished in 1918
Taurida Governorate